Yangmiao Township is a township in Guzhen County, Anhui, China. , it administers the following four residential neighborhoods and 22 villages:
Neighborhoods
Yangmiao
Heji
Caoxu
Jiangnan

Villages
Anji Village
Anwei Village
Renhu Village
Mendongwang Village
Zhaohu Village
Tianhu Village
Liuwei Village
Yaowang Village
Zhangzhuang Village
Mengmiao Village
Sangyuan Village
Beiwei Village
Zhangxiang Village
Lujing Village
Sunqian Village
Qiaodian Village
Yanwan Village
Xienan Village
Qiaowei Village
Songnan Village
Loushang Village
Miaoxin Village

References 

Township-level divisions of Anhui
Guzhen County